George Khouri is a retired Syrian footballer who played for the Syria national football team during the 1980s.

Career
Khouri spent most of his career in Al-Jaish, then played for Tishreen, and in Oman.

He played for Syria in different tournaments such as: 1984 AFC Asian Cup, 1986 FIFA World Cup qualification (AFC), 1988 Arab Nations Cup, 1988 AFC Asian Cup and 1987 Mediterranean Games in which he managed to win a penalty for Syria to beat France B 2–1 in the final.

References

1962 births
Living people
Sportspeople from Damascus
Syrian footballers
Association football midfielders
Syria international footballers
Al-Jaish Damascus players
Tishreen SC players
1984 AFC Asian Cup players
1988 AFC Asian Cup players
Competitors at the 1987 Mediterranean Games
Mediterranean Games gold medalists for Syria
Syrian Christians
Mediterranean Games medalists in football
Syrian Premier League players